Matthew J. O'Shea is the Alderman of the 19th ward of Chicago, serving since 2011.

Early life and education, and career
O'Shea is a lifelong resident of the 19th ward.

O'Shea attended Christ the King elementary school and Mount Carmel High School. He received a degree from Saint Mary's University of Minnesota.

In his career, O'Shea worked as a social worker, and later became the director of a community center. He also served as an aide to his 19th ward aldermanic predecessor Virginia Rugai.

O'Shea has sat on several boards in the Beverly neighborhood, and has been a volunteer and board member for the Special Olympics Chicago.

Aldermanic career
O'Shea was first elected alderman in 2011. He has been reelected in 2015 and 2019.

He was supportive of Rahm Emanuel as Mayor of Chicago, and has claimed to have made safety a top priority for his ward.

Among the committees O'Shea has served on are Aviation, Budget and Government Operations, Committees and Rules, Economic, Capital and Technology Development, Education and Child Development, Finance, Health and Human Relations, License and Consumer Protection, Health and Human Relations, Public Safety, Transportation and Public Way and the joint committees on Committees and Rules/Finance, Health and Human Relations/Workforce Development, Public Safety/ Education, as well as the Special Legislative Committee on the Census. In June 2018, mayor Rahm Emanuel appointed O'Shea as the chairman of city aviation committee. He also has served as the vice chair of the Committee on Committees and Rules and the Joint Committee on Committees and Rules/ Finance.

In the 2019 Chicago mayoral election, O'Shea endorsed Jerry Joyce in the first round of the election and endorsed Lori Lightfoot in the runoff. His endorsement of Lightfoot has been credited with securing her strong support in his ward in the runoff vote.

References

External links

1969 births
21st-century American politicians
Chicago City Council members
Living people